The 2016–17 season was Ulster's 23rd season since the advent of professionalism in rugby union, and the third under Director of Rugby Les Kiss and head coach Neil Doak. They completed in the European Rugby Champions Cup and the final season of the Pro12 before it became the Pro14 with the addition of two teams from South Africa.

Ulster announced in August 2016 that Rory Best would vacate the captaincy of the province. The  captain was replaced in his role by Andrew Trimble, the team's record try-scorer, and Rob Herring, who took on the role in Best's absence the previous season. Scrum-half Ruan Pienaar was going into his last season with Ulster, after the IRFU blocked him from extending his contract.

New arrivals were South African number 8 Marcell Coetzee from the Sharks, fullback Charles Piutau from Wasps, prop Rodney Ah You from Connacht, lock Kieran Treadwell from Harlequins, out-half Brett Herron from Bath, scrum-half Angus Lloyd from Trinity, and prop Anton Peikrishvili from Brive. Back row forward Nick Williams left for Cardiff Blues, centre Sammy Arnold for Munster, wing Rory Scholes for Edinburgh, and lock Dan Tuohy for Bristol. Out-half Ian Humphreys retired, and Willie Faloon, Paul Jackson,  Ruaidhri Murphy, Bronson Ross, Paul Rowley, Frank Taggart and Sam Windsor were released. Academy players who made their debuts this season included flanker Nick Timoney and wing Rob Lyttle. 

Assistant coach Joe Barakat left in December to join Western Force. In early 2017 it was revealed that head coach Neil Doak and assistant coach Allen Clarke would not have their contracts renewed at the end of the season. Doak's replacement would be Jono Gibbes, with Clarke to be succeeded by Dwayne Peel.

In the Pro12, Ulster finished fifth, qualifying for next season's Champions Cup but missing out on the playoffs. Flanker Sean Reidy led the league in tackles with 263. Ulster led the league in discipline and scrums. At the end of the season, Charles Piutau was named Players' Player of the Season, and he and scrum-half Ruan Pienaar made the Pro12 Dream Team. Pienaar's try against Glasgow Warriors was named Try of the Season. They finished bottom of Pool 5 in the Champions Cup, winning two and losing four. Out-half Paddy Jackson was leading scorer with 162 points, with Ruan Pienaar contributing 100 points. Charles Piutau and wing Jacob Stockdale were joint leading try scorers with nine each. Sean Reidy was leading tackler with 329. 

At the end of the season, Ruan Pienaar departed for Montpellier, and flanker Roger Wilson retired with a record 221 appearances. Charles Piutau was Ulster's Player of the Season.

Staff

Squad

Senior squad

Players In
 Charles Piutau from  Wasps
 Rodney Ah You from  Connacht
 Kieran Treadwell from  Harlequins
 Marcell Coetzee from  Sharks
 Brett Herron from  Bath Rugby
 Angus Lloyd from  Trinity College Dublin
 Anton Peikrishvili from  CA Brive

Players Out
 Nick Williams to  Cardiff Blues
 Sammy Arnold to  Munster
 Rory Scholes to  Edinburgh Rugby
 Ian Humphreys retired
 Dan Tuohy to  Bristol Rugby
 Willie Faloon released 
 Paul Jackson released 
 Ruaidhri Murphy released 
 Bronson Ross released 
 Paul Rowley released 
 Frank Taggart released 
 Sam Windsor released 

 Irish Provinces are currently limited to four non-Irish eligible (NIE) players and one non-Irish qualified player (NIQ or "Project Player").

Academy squad

European Rugby Champions Cup

Pro12

End of season awards
Charles Piutau was named Players' Player of the Season,  and the left winger on the Pro12 Dream Team.

Friendlies

Ulster A

British and Irish Cup

Pool 1

Quarter-finals

Home attendance

Ulster Rugby Awards
The Heineken Ulster Rugby Awards ceremony was held at Aquinas Diocesan Grammar School, Belfast, on 6 May 2017. Winners were:

Bank of Ireland Ulster Player of the Year: Charles Piutau
Heineken Ulster Rugby Personality of the Year: Ruan Pienaar
BT Young Player of the Year: Jacob Stockdale
Rugby Writers Player of the Year: Sean Reidy
Ulster Rugby Supporters Club Player of the Year: Ruan Pienaar
Abbey Insurance Academy Player of the Year: Ross Kane

Roger Wilson was given a special award for retiring as the province's most capped player, with 221 appearances. Honours caps were awarded for appearance milestones to Tommy Bowe (150), Chris Henry (150), Luke Marshall (100) and Rob Herring (100).

The Danske Bank Schools Player of the Year was won by Michael Lowry of RBAI, beating nominees James Hume (RBAI) and Stewart Moore (Ballymena Academy).

Season reviews
Ulster Rugby: Who did what 2016 – 2017, The Front Row Union, 17 May 2017

References

2016-17
2016–17 in Irish rugby union
2016–17 Pro12 by team
2016–17 European Rugby Champions Cup by team